Platismatia herrei is a species of corticolous (bark-dwelling), foliose lichen in the family Parmeliaceae. It was first formally described as a species of Cetraria in 1968 by lichenologist Henry Imshaug. William and Chicita Culberson transferred it to the genus Platismatia in 1968. The lichen is found in western North America, ranging from southern Alaska to central California. It is distinguished from other members of its genus by the isidia that fringe the edges of its linear lobes; the Culbersons described it as "one of the most beautiful and intricately formed species in the genus".

References

Parmeliaceae
Lichen species
Lichens described in 1954
Lichens of Western Canada
Lichens of Subarctic America
Lichens of the Northwestern United States
Lichens of the Southwestern United States
Taxa named by Henry Andrew Imshaug